Abhilash Gogoi (born 6 October 1995) is an Indian cricketer. He made his Twenty20 debut on 9 November 2019, for Assam in the 2019–20 Syed Mushtaq Ali Trophy. He made his List A debut on 23 February 2021, for Assam in the 2020–21 Vijay Hazare Trophy.

References

External links
 

1995 births
Living people
Indian cricketers
Assam cricketers
Place of birth missing (living people)